Macclesfield is a town in Cheshire East, England. It was originally a market town, and was granted a charter in 1261.  The medieval town surrounded a hilltop that contained the Church of St Michael and the marketplace.  Industry came to the town in the 18th century following the building of the first silk mill by Charles Roe in 1743.  This industry grew with the building of more mills, and of houses incorporating weavers' garrets on the top floor, with large windows to light them.  The mills were initially supplied with power from horses, or from the River Bollin, which ran through the town.  Later, steam power was introduced.   Communication was improved by the building of the Macclesfield Canal, which was completed in 1831.  The silk industry declined from 1851, industry in the town diversified, and most of the surviving silk mills were converted into other industrial purposes or for domestic use.  During the 20th century, some of the buildings were cleared from the town centre, and housing estates were built on the periphery of the town.

The history of the town is reflected in its listed buildings.  Apart from an ancient cross shaft, St Michael's Church and the Unitarian chapel, the oldest listing buildings are houses, most of which are timber-framed or have a timber-framed core.  From the late 17th century to the early 19th century many of the listed buildings are Neoclassical or Georgian in style.  Most of the early silk mills have been demolished, the oldest surviving former silk mills being Little Street Mill, which was built in 1804, and Regency Mill, which was built in about 1820.  With the coming of the Victorian era the architectural style of the churches and public buildings changed from Neoclassical and Georgian to Gothic Revival.  The construction of the Macclesfield Canal resulted in a number of associated structures that have been listed, including eight bridges and a milestone.  Other developments in the town resulted in buildings that have been listed, including the Militia Barracks, constructed in the late 1850s, the cemetery that opened in 1866, and Parkside Hospital (originally an asylum) that opened in 1871.  In addition to listed houses, churches, public buildings, schools, mills, and public houses, there is a variety of other structures that have been listed; these include almshouses, boundary stones, bollards, and a museum.  The only listed buildings dating from the 20th century are the War Memorial, and a pair of telephone kiosks in front of the Town Hall.  As of 2014 there are 218 buildings that are recorded in the National Heritage List for England as designated listed buildings.  Of these, 18 are listed at Grade II*, the middle grade, and the others are at Grade II.  There are no buildings listed at Grade I.

Key

Buildings

See also

Listed buildings in Bollington
Listed buildings in Gawsworth
Listed buildings in Henbury
Listed buildings in Higher Hurdsfield
Listed buildings in Macclesfield Forest and Wildboarclough
Listed buildings in Over Alderley
Listed buildings in Prestbury
Listed buildings in Rainow
Listed buildings in Sutton

References
Citations

Sources

 

 
 
 
 

 
 
 
 

Listed buildings in the Borough of Cheshire East
Lists of listed buildings in Cheshire
Listed buildings